Skrobotowo  is a village in the administrative district of Gmina Karnice, within Gryfice County, West Pomeranian Voivodeship, in northwestern Poland.

References

Skrobotowo